The Solgol T'an'gwang Line, or Solgol Colliery Line, is an electrified railway line of the Korean State Railway in South P'yŏngan Province, North Korea, running from Songnam Ch'ŏngnyŏn Station on the P'yŏngdŏk Line to the Songnam Youth Colliery at Solgol.

History
The line was opened by the Korean State Railway in the 1970s.

Route 

A yellow background in the "Distance" box indicates that section of the line is not electrified.

References

Railway lines in North Korea
Standard gauge railways in North Korea